Wayne Chahoud is a Lebanese professional rugby league footballer who has played for the Parramatta Eels in the New South Wales Cup.

Chahoud is a Lebanese international.

References

Lebanese rugby league players
Lebanon national rugby league team players
Living people
Year of birth missing (living people)